Ellbogensee (German, 'Elbow Lake') is a lake in the Mecklenburg Lake District, in Germany. Although most of the lake is in the district of Mecklenburgische Seenplatte in the state of Mecklenburg-Vorpommern, a portion of its southern shore is in the state of Brandenburg.

At Strasen, at the western end of the lake, a canal and lock gives access to the Großer Pälitzsee, forming the first link of the Müritz–Havel–Wasserstraße. Navigation is administered as part of the Obere–Havel–Wasserstraße.

References 

Lakes of Mecklenburg-Western Pomerania
Lakes of Brandenburg
Federal waterways in Germany
LEllbogensee